is a Japanese professional wrestler who portrays the character of a ghost wrestler, who was killed after winning a cursed championship. He is best known for his work in Frontier Martial-Arts Wrestling and Big Japan Pro Wrestling. He is the founder of the 666 promotion.

Professional wrestling career
Onryo started his career as Wolf Ozawa in the Tokai University backyard wrestling promotion, where he was eventually discovered by Men's Teioh and invited to train in the Wrestle Yume Factory. There he adopted the gimmick of Onryo, an undead wrestler based on the Japanese folklore ghosts of the same name. Under this character, Onryo wore pale facepaint and shabby clothes that released ashes with each movement, and elements of his gimmick included the ability to turn invisible to his opponents and disappear at will.

Onryo gained popularity and began appearing in promotions like Pro Wrestling Fujiwara Gumi, Wrestle Association R and Dramatic Dream Team before eventually signing with Frontier Martial Arts Wrestling (FMW) in 2000. He also participated in that year's Super J-Cup, eliminating Curry Man before being eliminated himself by Cima. His FMW tenure would be the most prolific one, however. He participated in a feud with Goemon about a cursed championship that slowly killed his champion, which was revealed as the reason why Onryo became a ghost in the past. 

In 2003, Onryo founded Wrestling of Darkness 666, also known as simply 666 (Triple Six), along with The Crazy SKB. Along with his participations in 666, he found his niche in Big Japan Pro Wrestling teaming with (and occasionally facing) Men's Teioh in cruiserweight matches.

Championships and accomplishments
666
666 Chaos Openweight Championship (1 time)
Frontier Martial-Arts Wrestling
WEW Tag Team Championship (1 time) - with GOEMON
WEW Hardcore Tag Team Championship (1 time) - with GOEMON
Kaientai Dojo
UWA World Middleweight Championship (1 time)
Wrestling Marvelous Future
WMF Junior Heavyweight Championship (1 time)
WEW Tag Team Championship (1 time) - with Tetsuhiro Kuroda

References

Japanese male professional wrestlers
Living people
People from Ōta, Gunma
Date of birth missing (living people)
Year of birth missing (living people)
Tokai University alumni
20th-century professional wrestlers
21st-century professional wrestlers
WEW Hardcore Tag Team Champions
WEW World Tag Team Champions
UWA World Middleweight Champions